Sundul Gan: The Story of Kaskus (also Sundul Gan) (Pre-2016 known as Ken Andrew The Movie) is an Indonesian film directed by Naya Anindita, released on June 2, 2016 about Andrew "Kaskus" Darwis, Ken Lawadinata and friends. Shooting locations is Jakarta, Indonesia, and Seattle, United States.

Cast
 Dion Wiyoko as Ken Dean Lawadinata
 Albert Halim as Andrew Darwis

References

2016 films